The Assiniboine River is a  river that runs through the prairies of Western Canada in Saskatchewan and Manitoba. It is a tributary of the Red River. The Assiniboine is a typical meandering river with a single main channel embanked within a flat, shallow valley in some places and a steep valley in others. Its main tributaries are the Qu'Appelle, Souris and Whitesand Rivers. For early history and exploration see Assiniboine River fur trade.

The river takes its name from the Assiniboine First Nation. Robert Douglas of the Geographical Board of Canada (1933) made several comments as to its origin: "The name commemorates the Assiniboine natives called by La Vérendrye in 1730 'Assiniboils' and by Governor Knight in 1715 of the Hudson's Bay Company 'stone Indians.' Assiniboine is the name of an Indian tribe and is derived from 'assine' a stone and 'bwan' native name of the Sioux, hence Stony Sioux name was possibly given because they used heated stones in cooking their food."

Course
  The Assiniboine River rises in eastern Saskatchewan east of the community of Kelvington on the upper prairie level above the Manitoba Escarpment. The Assiniboine River flows through three basic zones with different channel characteristics. Upstream of Brandon, the main stem of the river and its most important tributaries flow within a very large valley. The valley was cut by huge glacial melt water flows at the end of the last glaciation. The floor of this spillway valley provides a natural floodplain for the river and the valley provides a significant storage volume making the construction of the Shellmouth Dam north of Russell both technically and economically viable. The major tributaries in this reach are the Qu'Appelle, Shell and Little Saskatchewan Rivers.

The glacial flows created a large delta east of Brandon extending almost to Portage la Prairie. In this valley, the river is confined with a narrow valley floor. The Souris River is the primary tributary contributing flow to the Assiniboine in this reach.
Near Portage la Prairie the river emerges from the delta reach onto the relatively flat Red River plain (the floor of former Glacial Lake Agassiz) and at this point it can flow in any direction from roughly northwest to roughly southeast. The gradient of the river channel within the delta reach to the west is relatively high, so the river water velocities are fairly high and the waters of the river carry significant amounts of sediment. The gradient in the flat Red River plain is much less and the velocity of the river water flowing over this plain is much lower. Therefore, the sediments carried by the river waters as they flow through the delta reach are deposited onto the plain. The Assiniboine winds its way east eventually joining the Red River at "The Forks" in Winnipeg, Manitoba.

Today, Assiniboine Herald at the Canadian Heraldic Authority is named after the river. Asessippi Provincial Park, an RV park was built on the east shore of the Shellmouth Reservoir.

Tributaries include the Whitesand River which joins it near Kamsack, Saskatchewan, the Souris River, which joins it near Wawanesa, Manitoba, the Birdtail River which joins at the Birdtail Sioux First Nation, the Little Saskatchewan, which joins west of Brandon, and the Qu'Appelle River, which joins near the site of the Hudson's Bay Company historic Fort Ellice site.

The Assiniboine River has followed its modern course for approximately 700 years. The Assiniboine River formerly met the Red River near the present-day mouth of the La Salle River.

Flow rates and flood potential

There are three hydrometric stations on the river that have been taking measurements since 1913. The following discharge rates were recorded during the 1995 flood:

It is prone to spring flooding. Some flood flows can be diverted into Lake Manitoba at Portage la Prairie. In 1967, the Shellmouth Dam was built in Shellmouth to help reduce flood peaks and to supplement flows during dry periods. The Portage Diversion was completed in 1970. Despite these efforts, in May 2011 it was necessary to breach one of the dikes beside the river to relieve flood stresses east of Portage la Prairie. A Manitoba-wide state of emergency was declared in the wake of  one in three hundred-year floods on the Assiniboine River at Brandon. Below are the actual observed flow rates for major floods at different locations along the river:

Note: Flows in 1882 occurred before any flood protection measures such as the Shellmouth Reservoir and Portage Diversion were built.

Looking specifically at the Assiniboine River at Portage La Prairie, where maximum river flows occur prior to historical spillovers (prior to construction of the Portage Diversion and the Lower Assiniboine River Dikes) into the watersheds of Lake Manitoba and the La Salle River, the top 10 calculated natural peak flow rates before construction of the current flood infrastructure are:

Fauna

Fish species include walleye, yellow perch, northern pike, mooneye, burbot, channel catfish brown bullhead, rock bass, white sucker, shorthead redhorse and common carp.

See also
List of longest rivers of Canada
List of rivers of Manitoba
List of rivers of Saskatchewan

References

External links
 Fish Species of Saskatchewan
 Encyclopedia of Saskatchewan

 
Rivers of Manitoba
Rivers of Saskatchewan
Tributaries of Hudson Bay
Tributaries of the Red River of the North
Assiniboia, Winnipeg